Hippopus is a genus of large tropical saltwater clams, marine bivalve molluscs in the subfamily Tridacninae, the giant clam subfamily, of the family Cardiidae.

Species
 Hippopus hippopus (Linnaeus, 1758)(Bear paw clam)
 Hippopus porcellanus Rosewater, 1982 (China clam)
Species brought into synonymy
 Hippopus brassica  Bosc, 1801 accepted as Hippopus hippopus (Linnaeus, 1758)
 Hippopus equinus Mörch, 1853 accepted as  Hippopus hippopus (Linnaeus, 1758)
 Hippopus maculatus Lamarck, 1801 accepted as  Hippopus hippopus (Linnaeus, 1758)

References

 Neo M.L., Wabnitz C.C.C., Braley R.D., Heslinga G.A., Fauvelot C., Van Wynsberge S., Andrefouet S., Waters C., Shau-Hwai Tan A., Gomez E.D., Costello M.J. & Todd P.A. (2017). Giant Clams (Bivalvia: Cardiidae: Tridacninae): A comprehensive update of species and their distribution, current threats and conservation status. Oceanography and Marine Biology: An Annual Review. 55: 87-388

External links
 Lamarck, J.B.M. (1799). Prodrome d'une nouvelle classification des coquilles, comprenant une rédaction appropriée des caractères géneriques, et l'établissement d'un grand nombre de genres nouveaux. Mémoires de la Société d'Histoire Naturelle de Paris. 1: 63-91
 Gistel, Johannes [Nepomuk Franz Xaver. (1848). Naturgeschichte des Tierreichs: für höhere Schulen. [text book]. 1-216, i-xvi, Plates 1-32. Stuttgart. Scheitlin & Krais]
 Poorten, J.J. ter, 2005. Outline of a systematic index - Recent Cardiidae (Lamarck, 1809). VISAYA net. (Updated 2009 for WoRMS),

Tridacninae
Bivalve genera
Taxonomy articles created by Polbot